Agrias is a genus of Neotropical charaxine nymphalid butterflies found in South and Central America.

The German lepidopterist Hans Fruhstorfer wrote:
"In this magnificent tropical genus, upon which nature seems to have showered all her abundance of most brilliant colours, and which is, therefore, justly called the 'princely race' of the Nymphalidae, we are most surprised to meet a repetition of two genera of not less abundant colours: the Callithea and Catagramma, except that the Agrias species greatly excel the latter in size and magnificent colours, and only the males of this genus bear a sexual distinction in the shape of a hair-brush on the hindwings. Some of them, like the famous A. sardanapalus, having been first discovered by Bates in the Amazon Valley, are of an absolutely charming beauty, and the contrast of its purple-red forewings beaming through a blue lustre hued over them as if in a violet purple gloss, with the brilliantly sapphire-blue hindwings, is undoubtedly one of the most magnificent sights that nature has ever produced in the whole world of butterflies."

Prized by collectors, these large, showy butterflies have had hundreds of names applied to polymorphic variants.

Description

The species of the genus Agrias have, variously, very bright red, orange, iridescent blue and yellow colouration contrasting on the black or bluish background of their upperside wing. The underside wings are patterned. They have a robust appearance (broad thorax and short wide abdomen) allowing fast flight. The wingspan is 70–120 mm. Males of all Agrias species have prominent yellow tufts of androconial scales on the hindwings. These disperse pheromones for attracting suitable mates.

Biology
Adult Agrias live in the forest canopy, occasionally visiting the forest floor to feed on decomposing fruit. The butterflies always feed and rest with their wings closed, but if disturbed they may give a rapid flick of the wings, displaying the vivid colours of the upperside. Males establish territories and perch on tree trunks, branches, and even the ground.

Agrias larvae feed on Erythroxylum. The smooth and round eggs are laid singly on the leaves of the food plant. The larvae are pale brownish, marked with lichen-green spots, have recurved "horns" on the head capsule and a bifid tail. They feed at night and spend the day on twigs. The pupa is pale green. It has a dorsal hump, and tapers sharply toward a stout cremaster and the bifid head. It is suspended from a stem or leaf of the food plant.

Habitat
Agrias are found in both lowland and montane tropical wet forests. Adults of Agrias amydon are also found in pasture habitats in the wet season but probably pass most, or all, of the long dry season in forest refugia. During the dry season, strong-flying A. amydon undoubtedly forage in open areas, only to return to sheltered retreats in response to thermal stress.

Mimicry
Agrias phalcidon is a Mullerian mimic with the Asterope (formerly Callithea) species complex.

Systematics

Clade showing phylogenetics of Agrias.

Hybrids
Prepona × sarumani was described by Paul Smart in 1976 is considered to be a hybrid between Prepona praeneste abrupta and Agrias claudina lugens. Intergeneric hybrids are rare and this may indicate Prepona is very closely related to Agrias or that the genera should be combined.

Species
The following species are accepted by the Atlas of Neotropical Lepidoptera.

 Agrias aedon – Aegon agrias
 Agrias amydon – white-spotted agrias
 Agrias claudina (including A. sardanapalus) – Claudina agrias
 Agrias hewitsonius 
 Agrias narcissus

Other authors differ, for instance in regarding A. narcissus as a subspecies of A. aedon.

References

 Barselou, P. (1983), The genus Agrias (Nymphalidae) , Sciences Nat, Venette. 
 Le Moult, 1931–1933, Formes nouvelles ou peu connues d'Agrias. Novitates Entomologicae
Floquet, Ph., 2008. Agrias, Volume 1. Publication à compte d’auteur. 98 pp  accepts the same 9 species as Spath (q.v.)
Floquet, Ph., 2010. Agrias, Volume 2. Publication à compte d’auteur. 57 pp
 Floquet, P., 2010: A new form of Agrias phalcidon Hewitson, in the Maues region, Amazonas, Brazil (Lepidoptera: Nymphalidae). Lambillionea CX 1 (Tome 1): 132–135.
 Floquet, P.,2010: Les variations chez Agrias phalcidon phalcidon Hewitson, 1855,et description de la femelle de la forme floqueti Floquet, 2010, Brésil(Lepidoptera, Nymphalidae)'Lambillionea' CXI, 3.
 Floquet, P., 2011. Les variations chez Agrias pericles Bates (1860),de la région de Maues et Itaituba au Brésil (Lepidoptera, Nymphalidae) Lambillionea CXI, 1.
 Floquet, P., 2012. Les variations chez Agrias phalcidon excelsior Lathy, 1924, Brésil(Lepidoptera, Nymphalidae)Lambillionea CXII, 1.
 Floquet, P., 2011. Les variations chez Agrias phalcidon ssp.fournierae (Fassl, 1921),au Brésil (Lepidoptera, Nymphalidae)Lambillionea CXI.
 Floquet, P., 2011. Forme rouge d’Agrias amydon smalli Miller & Nicolay (1971),du Costa-Rica (Lepidoptera, Nymphalidae)Lambillionea CXI, 1.
 Floquet, P., 2012. Les sous-espèces d’Agrias narcissus Staudinger, 1886 et leurs variations(Lepidoptera, Nymphalidae)Lambillionea CXII, 2.
 Floquet, Ph., 2012. Les sous-espèces et variations chez Agrias beatifica Hewitson, 1869 (Lepidoptera, Nymphalidae) Lambillionea CXII, 3.
 Floquet, Ph., 2012. Agrias hewitsonius Bates, 1860 (Lepidoptera, Nymphalidae) Lambillionea CXII, 3
 Floquet, Ph., 2013. Variation chez l'Agrias phalcidon phalcidon Hewitson, 1855 f. floqueti Floquet, 2010, et description de la f. manfredi nov. Floquet,2013 Lambillionea CXIII, 1
 Floquet, Ph., 2013. Forme récurrente chez les Agrias Doubleday, 1845 (Lepidoptera, Nymphalidae) Lambillionea CXIII,1
 Floquet, Ph., 2013. Decouverte et description d'unenouvelle forme d'Agrias beatifica stuarti Godman & Salvin, 1882 f. pseudohewitsonius nov.(Lepidoptera, Nymphalidae) Lambillionea CXIII,2
 Floquet, Ph., 2013. - Formes et Variations chez les Agrias (Version Française). 72 pp.
 Floquet, Ph., 2013. - Agrias, Forms and Variations (English version). 72 pp.
 Floquet, Ph., 2014. Variations chez Agrias amydon athenais Fruhstorfer,1912 et description d'une forme nouvelle auriflamma (Lepidoptera, Nymphalidae) Lambillionea CXIV,3,2014
 Floquet, Ph., 2015. Notes sur les populations d'Agrias aedon Hewitson, 1848 du Costa Rica (Lepidoptera, Nymphalidae) Lambillionea CXV,3,2015
 Floquet, Ph., 2016. Découverte et description de la forme rouge d'Agrias phalcidon excelsior Lathy, 1924, Brésil f. akai nov. Floquet, 2015 (Lepidoptera, Nymphalidae) Lambillionea CXVI,1,2016
 Rebillard, P. (1961), Révision systématique des Lépidoptères Nymphalides du genre Agrias. Memoires du Museum National d`Histoire Naturelle, Nouvelle Serie, Serie A, Zoologie, Tome XXII, Fasicule 2.
 Späth, M. (1992), Sous-espèces et formes nouvelles d'Agrias. Bulletin de la Société Sciences Nat, 75–76. 
 Späth, M. (1999), Pt. 2. Agrias. In: E. Bauer (Ed.), Butterflies of the World. (Vol. Nymphalidae I, pp. 12 p., 20 col. plates). Keltern: Goecke & Evers.   Accepts 9 species Agrias beatifica Hewitson, 1869;Agrias hewitsonius Hewitson, 1860; Agrias sahlkei Honrath, [1885]; Agrias claudina (Godart, [1824]), Agrias aedon Hewitson, 1848; Agrias narcissus Staudinger, [1885]; Agrias amydon Hewitson, 1854, Agrias phalcidon Hewitson, 1855 Agrias pericles Bates, 1860 
Allen M. Young, 1981 Responses by butterflies to seasonal conditions in lowland Guanacaste province, Costa Rica Journal of the Lepidopterists' Society 1981 Volume 35: 155-157 pdf	
Thomas S. Ray, 1985 The host plant, Erythroxylum (Erythroxylaceae), of Agrias (Nymphalidae) Journal of the Lepidopterists' Society  1985 Volume 39: 266-267 pdf  includes photos of larvae and pupae
George T. Austin, 2009 Nymphalidae of Rondônia, Brazil: Variation and phenology of Agrias (Charaxinae). Tropical Lepidoptera Research 19(1): 29–34, 33 figs. pdf
Carlos Antonio Peña Bieberach, 2009 Evolutionary history of the butterfly subfamily Satyrinae (Lepidoptera: Nymphalidae) Thesis Department of Zoology Stockholm University pdf
Furtado, E. 2008. Intergeneric hybridism between Prepona and Agrias (Lepidoptera: Nymphalidae, Charaxinae). Tropical Lepidoptera Research 18(1): 5–6.pdf

External links

Agrias (as Prepona) images at Consortium for the Barcode of Life 
Agrias claudina at ARKive
BOA Photographs of type specimens including subspecies and forma
"Agrias Doubleday, 1844" at Markku Savela's Lepidoptera and Some Other Life Forms
Agrias Butterflies: The Gems of the Insect World
Agrias photographs, Robert Aronheim collection 
Nymphalidae Study Group
The Agrias Page
Pteron (Japanese site with binomial names)
Janzen photos of larvae and pupae (2 pages). Via search Agrias + caterpillars

Charaxinae
Nymphalidae of South America
Nymphalidae genera
Taxa named by Henry Doubleday